1978 December is the fifth studio album by American country music singer-songwriter Sonia Leigh. It was her first album on Southern Ground and was released on September 27, 2011. The first single off the album was "My Name Is Money," which Juli Thanki of Engine 145 gave a "thumbs up."

Track listing
All songs written by Sonia Leigh; "I Won't Tell" and "Roamin'" co-written by Zac Brown.

Chart performance

Album

Singles

Notes
In 2010, Bar was covered by Zac Brown Band although she was featured on there. It is evidenced on the track listing of Pass the Jar: Zac Brown Band and Friends Live from the Fabulous Fox Theatre In Atlanta.

Personnel

Musicians
 Sonia Leigh – lead vocals, guitar (acoustic), percussion
 Zac Brown - guitar (acoustic), vocals
 Luke Bulla - fiddle
 Courtlan Clement - guitar (electric)
 Clay Cook - guitar (12 string acoustic), guitar (12 string electric), guitar (acoustic), guitar (baritone), guitar (electric), lap steel guitar, Mellotron, organ (Hammond) piano, vocals, Wurliter
 Nic Cowan - vocals
 Josh Day - percussion
 Donald Dunlavey -  guitar (electric)
 Chris Fryar - drums, percussion
 Tom Giampietro - percussion
 Katie Herron - percussion
 John Driskell Hopkins - vocals
 Kevin Leahy - drums (steel), percussion
 Kristy Lee - vocals
 Levi Lowrey - vocals
 Matt Mangano - bass, guitar (acoustic)
 Amy Ray - vocals
 Barry Waldrep - banjo
 Tiffany White - vocals
 Oliver Wood - guitar (electric)
Technical
 Sonia Leigh - composer
 Zac Brown – producer, composer
 Clay Cook - producer
 John Driskell Hopkins - engineer, producer
 John Kelton - engineer, mixing
 Matt Mangano - engineer, producer
 Frank Sandler - engineer
 Hank Williams - mastering

References

2011 albums
Sonia Leigh albums